This article describes a post-war "new 4 Aces" ship.  A pre-war ship of the same name was a member of the original "4 Aces." 

SS Exochorda was a 473-foot, 14,500-ton cargo liner in service with American Export Lines from 1948 to 1959. A member of the line's post-war quartet of ships, "4 Aces", Exochorda sailed regularly from New York on a Mediterranean route.  Originally built in 1944 as the military attack transport USS Dauphin (APA-97), the ship was extensively refurbished prior to her service as a passenger-cargo liner.  Following her service as a cruise liner, the vessel served as the floating dormitory ship  for the students of Stevens Institute of Technology, a technological university, in Hoboken, NJ.  At the end of her service life she was scrapped, in 1979.

Acquisition
After World War II, American Export Lines purchased four C3-class [[Windsor class attack transport|Windsor'-class]] attack transports built by Bethlehem Shipbuilding Corp. at Sparrow's Point, Maryland, had them refitted as passenger-cargo liners, and placed them in service as the new "4 Aces." USS Dauphin became Exochorda.

While in US Navy service from 1944 to 1948 Dauphin was awarded one battle star in the assault on and occupation of Okinawa and earned the Navy Occupation Service Medal for landing cargo and troops in Japan.  She was present in Tokyo Bay for the Surrender Ceremony of World War II, 2 September 1945.

Following the war, in November 1947, the ships were returned to dry dock at the Hoboken Yard of Bethlehem Steel Corporation for conversion into to passenger cargo ships for American Export Lines.  Dauphin became Exochorda of the post-war "4 Aces", taking her new name from her predecessor in the pre-war fleet.

Extensive Refurbishment

Fashioning the modern (1948) cruise liner Exochorda from Dauphin required stripping the vessel to the bare hull and machinery. An entirely new superstructure was built that included passenger staterooms located primarily on promenade and "A" decks.

Noted industrial decorator Henry Dreyfuss, whose many designs included the "Twentieth Century Limited" locomotive (1938) for the New York Central Railroad, and the  "500" desk telephone (1949), the Bell System standard for 45 years, designed the interiors.   Zalud Marine Corporation executed the design, including joiner work, that included thousands of feet of carpet, specially woven fabrics and an unusual amount of glass.Exochorda was among the first ships with fully air-conditioned staterooms, many of which were also soundproofed.  The ship's glass-enclosed promenade deck featured a built-in swimming pool and play area adjacent to a modern bar and smoking room.

Sea safety standards were unusually high and included modern (1948) smoke detection, fire control and fireproofing.

On the day following her final sea trials, 26 October 1948, the ship was formally delivered to American Export Lines at the company's terminal at Exchange Place, Jersey City, NJ.  Delivery had been delayed due to a faulty valve that needed replacement.  Exochorda departed on her maiden voyage November 1948.

Artwork
All artwork for the new 4 Aces ships had been selected by interior designer Henry Dreyfuss.  Dreyfuss had commissioned artist Miné Okubo to create a mural reflecting the ship's Mediterranean sailing route, to be located in the ship's main foyer.  Other notable artwork included white-on-black depictions of life at sea — whimsical "doodles" by artist Saul Steinberg — which added subtle context to Promenade's bar and smoking lounge.  While in the dining lounge, passengers were treated to Loren MacIver's mural portrayal of trade and commerce activities along the sailing route.  Despite being pictured in promenade's forward lounge in many "4 Aces" print advertisements, sculptress Mitzi Solomon had created only two unique marble carvings that were used on other "4 Aces" vessels.

Timeline of vessel
USS Dauphin (APA-97)
22 December 1943 — Laid down (as cargo ship)
10 June 1944 — Completed as Windsor-class military attack transport and launched by Bethlehem Sparrows Point Shipyard, Sparrows Point, Maryland
23 September 1944 — Transferred to Navy and commissioned as Dauphin
2 September 1945 — Present at the Surrender Ceremony of World War II in Tokyo Bay
30 April 1946 — Dauphin decommissioned
1948 — Dauphin sold for commercial service
SS Exochorda1948 — Refurbished as passenger-cargo ship, SS Exochorda, for American Export Lines
2 November 1948 — Maiden voyage of Exochorda1948–1959 — Exochorda served as passenger-cargo ship sailing from New York to the Mediterranean
15 March 1959 —  Exochorda towed to Bethlehem Steel Corp. for preparation to be placed in reserve fleet
1959–1967 — Returned to the US Maritime Administration and mothballed in Hudson River Reserve Fleet at Stony Point, NY
June 1967 — The U.S. Maritime Administration announced plans to sell the former cruise liner, Exochorda, for either non-transportation use or scrap
28 September 1967 — Announcement of Stevens Institute of Technology's bid of $130,301 for ExochordaOctober 1967 — US Maritime Administration awards Exochorda to Stevens Institute of Technology for $130,301 to be used as a floating dormitory
4 October 1967 — Exochorda was towed from the Hudson River Reserve Fleet in Jones Point, N.Y. to the Hoboken Yard of Bethlehem Steel Corporation in Hoboken, New Jersey to be refurbished as a dormitory
10 November 1967 — Vessel towed from the Bethlehem Steel Corporation to the school-owned Eight Street Pier, Stevens Institute of Technology, Hoboken, NJ

November 1967 — Christened SS StevensJanuary 1968 — First student residents of Stevens moved aboard
23 May 1975 — Last student leaves Stevens''
26 August 1975 — Last Voyage: towed from Hoboken NJ to a shipyard in Chester, PA
1975–1979 — Partially dismantled in Chester, PA
March 1979 — Resold to scrappers at Kearny, NJ

Notes

References

External links
Photo: USS Dauphin (APA-97); NavSource Online

Passenger ships
Ocean liners
Ships of American Export-Isbrandtsen Lines
Ships built in Sparrows Point, Maryland
1944 ships
Cargo liners